Caelostomus punctifrons is a species of ground beetle. It was described by Maximilien Chaudoir in 1850. It occurs in Sub-Saharan Africa and has been introduced to Jamaica.

References

Caelostomus
Beetles of Africa
Beetles of North America
Insects of Jamaica
Beetles described in 1850
Taxa named by Maximilien Chaudoir